Truman Fontell "Fonty" Flock (March 21, 1920 – July 15, 1972) was an American stock car racer.

Flock family
He was the brother of NASCAR pioneers Tim Flock and Bob Flock, and the second female NASCAR driver Ethel Mobley. The four raced at the July 10, 1949 race at the Daytona Beach Road Course, which was the first event to feature a brother and a sister, and the only NASCAR event to feature four siblings. Ethel beat Fonty and Bob by finishing in eleventh.

Racing career

Moonshine
Like many early NASCAR drivers, Flock's career began by delivering illegal moonshine. He started delivering on his bicycle as a teenager. He used his car to deliver moonshine as he got older. "I used to deliberately seek out the sheriff and get him to chase me," he later recalled. "It was fun, and besides we could send to California to get special parts to modify our cars, and the sheriff couldn't afford to do that."

Early career
Flock won a 100-mile race at Lakewood Speedway Park in Atlanta, Georgia in 1940. He raced on dirt tracks in Georgia.

He qualified in the pole position for the July 27, 1941 race at the Daytona Beach Road Course beside Roy Hall. Flock took the early lead before he and Hall got together in the south turn. Flock rolled and landed upside down in bushes. The seatbelt broke during the rolling, and Flock was tossed around. He was rushed by ambulance to the hospital, having suffered a crushed chest, broken pelvis, head and back injuries, and severe shock.

World War II
Flock was in the United States Army Air Corps for four years during World War II.

NASCAR career

His brother convinced car owner Ed Schenck to put Flock in his car at the first race at the North Wilkesboro Speedway on May 5, 1947. Flock won the pole and his heat race. He won the 30-lap feature after not racing in 4½ years. He took over his brother Bob's ride later in the season after Bob broke his back. He won seven of 47 races that season, and beat Ed Samples and Red Byron to win the National Championship Stock Car Circuit championship.

He won eleven features and won the NASCAR National Modified championship in 1949. He raced in six of eight Strictly Stock (later Grand National Series) events and finished fifth in the points.

He raced his first full-time season in the Grand National series in 1951. He had eight wins, 22 Top-10s, and 13 poles to finish second in the points. He won the 100-mile Grand National Stock Car race at Bainbridge Speedway, Solon, Ohio, on July 9, 1951.

He had two wins, 17 Top-10s, and seven poles in 1952. He finished fourth in the points.

He was leading by more than a minute at the 1953 Daytona Beach Road Course race but ran out of gas taking the white flag at the start of the final lap. Flock's teammate pushed his car into the pits. Bill Blair passed to win the race in a 1953 Oldsmobile. Flock finished second by 26 seconds. He had four wins, 17 Top-10 finishes, and three poles to finish fourth in the final points.

He opened an insurance agency in 1954, racing part-time after that.

Flock raced 31 of 45 events in 1955. He had three wins, 14 Top-10s, and six poles. He finished eleventh in the points.

He had his final win in 1956 at the Charlotte Speedway.

In 1957, he raced at the Daytona Beach Road Course. Herb Thomas had been gravely injured in a 1956 race held at the Cleveland County Fairgrounds in Shelby, North Carolina so he asked Flock to drive the car in the 1957 Southern 500. Flock accepted. He spun and was smashed by Bobby Myers and Paul Goldsmith on lap 27, injuring all, and killing Myers. From the hospital bed, Flock announced his retirement. He died on July 15, 1972 after a lengthy illness.

Awards
Flock was inducted in the Talladega-Texaco Walk of Fame in 2004.
He was inducted into the Georgia Automobile Racing Hall of Fame Association in 2004.

Media

Appeared as a mystery challenger on the Apr 15, 1956 episode of What's My Line? on CBS television.

Motorsports career results

NASCAR
(key) (Bold – Pole position awarded by qualifying time. Italics – Pole position earned by points standings or practice time. * – Most laps led. ** – All laps led.)

Grand National Series

Convertible Division

References

External links

Biography at Talladega Walk of Fame
Granddaughter's website includes photos
Biography at decadesofracing.net
Biography at hickoksports.com
Fonty Flock at The Crittenden Automotive Library includes career Strictly Stock/Grand National Statistics and complete Grand National win list.
Georgia Automobile Racing Hall of Fame

1920 births
1972 deaths
United States Army Air Forces personnel of World War II
Flock family
NASCAR drivers
People from Fort Payne, Alabama
Racing drivers from Alabama